The 1934 Richmond Spiders football team was an American football team that represented the University of Richmond as a member of the Virginia Conference during the 1934 college football season. Led by first-year head coach, Glenn Thistlethwaite, Richmond compiled an overall record of 8–1 with a mark of 2–1 in conference play, sharing the Virginia Conference title with William & Mary.

Schedule

References

Richmond
Richmond Spiders football seasons
Richmond Spiders football